The Kingdom of Lower Burgundy,  also called Cisjurane Burgundy, was a historical kingdom in what is now southeastern France, so-called because it was lower down the Rhône Valley than Upper Burgundy. It included some of the territory of the Kingdom of Arelat.

The borders of Lower Burgundy were the Mediterranean Sea to the south, Septimania to the southwest, Aquitaine to the west, the Kingdom of Upper Burgundy to the north, and the Kingdom of Italy to the east.

History

The West Frankish King Louis the Stammerer died on 10 April 879 and was survived by two adult sons, Louis and Carloman. Boso, Count of Vienne, renounced allegiance to both brothers and in July claimed independence of the Kingdom of Provence. On 15 October 879, the bishops and nobles of the region around the rivers Rhône and Saône assembled in the Synod of Mantaille and elected Boso king as successor to Louis the Stammerer, the first non-Carolingian king in Western Europe in more than a century. This was the first "free election" of a king among the Franks, without regard to royal descent, though his mother was a Carolingian. The Kingdom of Provence comprised the ecclesiastical provinces of the archbishops of Arles, Aix, Vienne, Lyon (without Langres), and probably Besançon, as well as the dioceses of Tarentaise, Uzès, and Viviers.

Boso was an incompetent ruler and by 882 King Carloman of West Francia reintegrated the kingdom into the West Frankish realm. When Carloman died on 12 December 884, the nobles of that kingdom (which included Lower Burgundy), invited Charles the Fat to assume the kingship. Arnulf of Carinthia deposed his uncle Charles in November 887. In 890 Boso's son Louis the Blind was crowned King of Lower Burgundy.

Louis the Blind was invited into Italy by Adalbert II of Tuscany who wished to keep Berengar of Friuli from gaining control of the Italian peninsula. Louis defeated Berengar and was crowned Holy Roman Emperor by Pope Benedict IV. Berengar defeated Louis the next year, forced him to flee Italy and promise to never return. In 905, Louis again invaded Italy but was defeated and blinded for breaking his oath. Louis lost his titles of King of Italy and Holy Roman Emperor to Berengar.

Blinded, Louis made Hugh of Arles, the Count of Provence, his regent. Hugh was elected King of Italy in 924 during a Civil War, and he spent the next two years ejecting his opponent, King Rudolph II of Upper Burgundy, from Italy. Louis died in 928 and was succeeded by Hugh. After failing to expand his power by a marriage to Marozia (the effective ruler of Rome), Hugh spent the next five years of his reign fighting Magyar raids and Andalusian pirates. In 933, Hugh made peace with Rudolph of Upper Burgundy by giving him the Kingdom of Lower Burgundy, and the two Burgundies were combined into the Kingdom of Burgundy, also known from the 12th century as Kingdom of Arles.

References

See also
List of dukes, kings, counts, and margraves of Provence

879 establishments
Former countries in Europe
Former kingdoms
9th-century establishments in France
States and territories established in the 870s
930s disestablishments